O2Be is an American comedy television series starring Lizz Winstead and Brian Unger. The series premiered September 22, 2002, on Oxygen. The program is a parody of daytime television with Winstead and Unger as hosts of their own talk show.

Cast
Lizz Winstead as host Lizz Winstead
Brian Unger as host Brian Unger
Frank Conniff as TV's Conniff, the stagehand

References

External links
 

2000s American satirical television series
2002 American television series debuts
2002 American television series endings
Oxygen (TV channel) original programming
2000s American television talk shows
English-language television shows